Melvyn Sage (born 24 March 1964) is an English former footballer. He played as a full back for Gillingham and Derby County in a ten-year career which was ultimately cut short by injury.

Playing career
Sage began his career as an apprentice professional with his hometown club, Gillingham, turning professional in 1982. He soon forced his way into the first team and became a regular in the defence, as well as attracting attention from larger clubs. In the 1985-86 season he was an ever-present in the team and named the club's Player of the Year, after which he was snapped up by Derby County, who had just clinched promotion to Division Two, for a fee of £60,000. The following season he helped the Rams gain promotion to Division One and in all made over 140 league appearances for Derby before a succession of injuries, most notably a knee injury sustained in November 1991, forced him into retirement in 1992.

Post-playing career
After retiring from football, Sage returned to his hometown of Gillingham and became a taxi driver.

Honours
Derby County

 Football League Second Division: 1986–87

Individual

 Gillingham Player of the Season: 1985–86

References

1964 births
Living people
People from Gillingham, Kent
English footballers
Association football defenders
Gillingham F.C. players
Derby County F.C. players
English Football League players
British taxi drivers